Goodview is an unincorporated community in Bedford County, Virginia, United States. Goodview has a post office with ZIP code 24095.

References

Unincorporated communities in Bedford County, Virginia
Unincorporated communities in Virginia